Za-Za is the third album from the heavy metal band BulletBoys, released in 1993. This was their last album released by Warner Bros. Records, and the final one produced by Ted Templeman.

Track listing

Personnel
 Marq Torien - lead vocals
 Mick Sweda - guitar, backing vocals
 Lonnie Vencent - bass, backing vocals
 Jimmy D'Anda - drums, percussion, backing vocals

References

1993 albums
BulletBoys albums
Albums produced by Ted Templeman
Warner Records albums